Tethea punctorenalia is a moth in the family Drepanidae. It is found in the Chinese provinces of Shaanxi and Sichuan.

References

Moths described in 1921
Thyatirinae